Nea Filadelfeia (meaning New Philadelphia) is a suburb of Athens, Greece. Since the 2011 local government reform it is part of the municipality Filadelfeia-Chalkidona, of which it is the seat and a municipal unit. The municipal unit has an area of 2.850 km2. It was named after the Anatolian city Filadelfeia, now Alaşehir in Turkey, and it was settled by Greek refugees from Asia Minor after the Greco-Turkish War (1919-1922).

Geography

Its built-up area is continuous with that of municipality of Athens and the surrounding suburbs Nea Chalkidona, Agioi Anargyroi, Acharnes, Metamorfosi and Nea Ionia. Motorway 1 (Athens - Thessaloniki) and Greek National Road 1 pass through the town. The park formerly hosted a large zoo which operated since 1955 to 1995. Nea Filadelfeia is roughly located at the geographical center of the Attica peninsula, around 13 km from the sea to the south suburbs and at a low elevation.

Education
Nea Filadelfeia has 9 primary schools, 4 secondary schools (one of them is athletic type) and 3 high schools. Among them is the 3rd High School of Nea Filadelfia "Miltos Kountouras".

Sports
Nea Filadelfeia is the historical home of A.E.K., a major Greek Multi-Sports Club established in 1924 in Nea Filadelfeia. It is also the home of Ionikos Nea Filadelfeia. The now demolished Nikos Goumas Stadium was the home ground of AEK F.C. from 1930 to 2003, while the Agia Sophia Stadium is  the new home ground from 2022. The Ionikos Nea Filadelfeia sports club is renowned in Greece and abroad for its handball, volleyball and basketball achievements.

Historical population

Climate
According to the Köppen Climate Classification system, Nea Filadelfeia has a hot-summer Mediterranean climate. Nea Filadelfeia is notorious in Greece for its summer heat; according to the Hellenic National Meteorological Service it registers Greece's highest mean maximum summer temperatures for the period 1955-1997. On 26 June 2007, Nea Filadelfeia recorded  while on the same day, the nearby official automatic H.N.M.S. weather station recorded , which is Europe's highest June temperature to date.

Notable people 
Elena Nathanael, Greek actress
Ange Postecoglou, former coach of the Australian national football team and Current Coach of Celtic F.C

Gallery

See also
List of municipalities of Attica

References

External links

Official website 
Νέα Φιλαδέλφεια

Populated places in Central Athens (regional unit)